The R. M. Jones General Store, also known as the Crossroads Store, is a historic general store in Jones Crossroads, Troup County, Georgia. The rock building was constructed by Monroe Jones in 1903. It has been owned and operated by members of the Avery family since the 1920s. It was added to the National Register of Historic Places on February 10, 2009. It is located at 6926 Whitesville Road. The store's history is noted on a historical marker for Jones Crossroads.

See also
National Register of Historic Places listings in Troup County, Georgia

References

External links
Photograph of store on Flickr and another

Commercial buildings on the National Register of Historic Places in Georgia (U.S. state)
Buildings and structures in Troup County, Georgia
National Register of Historic Places in Troup County, Georgia